Coffee culture has become a significant cultural phenomenon in Australia.

Australia has a distinct coffee culture. The coffee industry has grown from independent cafes since the early 20th century. The flat white first became popular in Australia, and its invention is claimed by a Sydneysider. The iconic Greek cafés of Sydney and Melbourne were the first to introduce locally roasted coffees in 1910.  Melbourne is sometimes called the “coffee capital of the World” with its plethora of cafés and roasteries. 

In 1952, the first espresso machines began to appear in Australia and a plethora of fine Italian coffee houses were emerging in Melbourne and Sydney. Pellegrini's Espresso Bar and Legend Café often lay claim to being Melbourne's first 'real' espresso bars, opening their doors in 1954 and 1956 respectively. This decade also saw the establishment of one of Australia's most iconic coffee brands, Vittoria, which remains the country's largest coffee maker and distributor. The brand has existed in Australia since 1958, well before it moved to the US.

To this day, international coffee chains such as Starbucks have very little market share in Australia, with Australia's long established independent cafés existing along with homegrown franchises such as The Coffee Club, Michel's Patisserie, Dôme in WA, and Zarraffas Coffee in Queensland. One reason for this is that unlike with the United States and Asia, Australia for many decades had already had an established culture of independent cafés before coffee chains tried to enter the market.
Australians are more focused on the specialty coffee culture, focusing on sourcing fresh coffee beans, roasting properly, and brewing the best coffee beans.

Coffee Industry in Australia
Australian coffee industry generates $5.8 billion USD in revenue per year

See also

Greek café culture in Australia
Italian café culture in Australia
Coffee in world cultures

References

External links